Quintino Bocaiuva is a neighborhood of Rio de Janeiro, Brazil. The locality is famous for being the former home of football (soccer) player Zico, who was nicknamed "Little Rooster from Quintino".

References

Neighbourhoods in Rio de Janeiro (city)